Rebecca Nicoli (born 29 September 1999) is an Italian boxer. She competed in the women's lightweight event at the 2020 Summer Olympics.

References

External links
 

1999 births
Living people
Italian women boxers
Olympic boxers of Italy
Boxers at the 2020 Summer Olympics
Boxers from Milan
21st-century Italian women
Mediterranean Games bronze medalists for Italy
Mediterranean Games medalists in boxing
Competitors at the 2022 Mediterranean Games